Filler materials are particles added to resin or binders (plastics, composites, concrete) that can improve specific properties, make the product cheaper, or a mixture of both. The two largest segments for filler material use is elastomers and plastics. Worldwide, more than 53 million tons of fillers (with a total sum of approximately US$18 billion) are used every year in application areas such as paper, plastics, rubber, paints, coatings, adhesives, and sealants. As such, fillers, produced by more than 700 companies, rank among the world's major raw materials and are contained in a variety of goods for daily consumer needs. The top filler materials used are ground calcium carbonate (GCC), precipitated calcium carbonate (PCC), kaolin, talc, and carbon black. Filler materials can affect the tensile strength, toughness, heat resistance, color, clarity etc. A good example of this is the addition of talc to polypropylene. Most of the filler materials used in plastics are mineral or glass based filler materials. Particulates and fibers are the main subgroups of filler materials. Particulates are small particles of filler which are mixed in the matrix where size and aspect ratio are important. Fibers are small circular strands that can be very long and have very high aspect ratios.

Types

Calcium carbonate (CaCO3)
Referred to as "chalk" in the plastic industry, calcium carbonate is derived from limestone and marble. It is used in many applications including PVC's and unsaturated polyesters. As much as 90% CaCO3 can be used to make a composite. These additions can improve molding productivity by decreasing cooling rate. They can also increase operating temperatures of materials and provide insulation for electrical wiring.

CaCO3 is used in filler masterbatch as a base with large percentage in composition. Calcium carbonate powder accounts for 97% of composition will bring for white/opaque products more whiteness. So manufacturers can reduce the usage of white masterbatch. With smaller percent, calcium carbonate powder can be used for color products. In addition, it brings for final plastic products more bright and glossy surface.

Kaolin
Kaolin is mainly used in plastics for its anti blocking characteristics as well as an infra red absorber in laser marking. It increases impact strength and heat resistance. Metakolinite is used to stabilize PVC. Kaolin has also been shown to increase the abrasion resistance and can replace carbon black as a filler material and improve flow properties of glass reinforced substances.

Magnesium hydroxide (talc)

Talc, a soft mineral and generally more expensive than calcium carbonate. It is derived from layering sheets of magnesium hydroxide with silica. In the plastic industry it is used for packaging and food application due to its long-term thermal stability.

Wollastonite (CaSiO3)
Wollastonite has an acicular structure with a relatively high specific gravity and high hardness. This filler can improve moisture content, wear resistance, thermal stability, and high dielectric strength. Wollastonite competes with platy filler substances like mica and talc and also can be used to replace glass fibers when creating thermoplastics and thermosets.

Glass

Glass filler materials come in a few diverse forms: glass beads, short glass fibers, long glass fibers.  in plastics by tonnage. Glass fibers are used to increase the mechanical properties of the thermoplastic or thermoset such as flexural modulus and tensile strength, There is normally not an economic benefit for adding glass as a filler material. Some disadvantages of having glass in the matrix include low surface quality, high viscosity when melted, poor weldability and warpage. The addition of glass beads will help with oil absorption and chemical resistance.

Fly ashes 
Coal and shale oil fly ashes have been used as a filler for thermoplastics that could be used for injection molding applications.

Nanofillers
Nanofiller have a particle size less than 100 nanometres. They have a high aspect ratio and are mainly used as scratch resistant and fire resistant fillers. Nanofillers can be broken out into three groups nanoplates, nanofibers, and nanoparticles. Nanoparticles are more widely used than nanoplates and nanofibers but nanoplates are starting to become more widely used. Nanoplates are like conventional platy fillers like talc and mica except the thickness is much smaller. Advantages of adding nanofillers include creating a gas barrier and their flame retardant properties.

Polymer foam beads
Polymer Foam Beads can have a bulk density as low as 0.011 g/cc and range in size from 45 microns to over 8 mm. Common drawbacks to using Polymer Foam Beads in formulated systems include static, temperature and chemical resistance limitations and difficulty achieving a homogenous blend within a formulated system due to their extremely low bulk density. However, these limitations can be mostly if not entirely overcome through the use of formulation modifications, additives and other surface treatments. Despite these potential challenges, Polymer Foam Beads can be added to formulated systems when weight or cost savings in a finished good are required.

Masonry filler
Masonry filler is used to repair cracks and holes in exterior walls, and is typically made using cement and hydrated lime. Manufacturers include Toupret.

Other fillers
Concrete filler materials include gravel, stone, sand, and rebar. Gravel, stone, and sand are used to reduce the cost of concrete. Rebars are used to strengthen the concrete.

Mechanical properties

Tensile strength
Tensile strength is the most used method to evaluate filler materials. The tensile strength of the composite can be calculated using the equation

σc= σp(1-aΦbf +cΦfd)

where
σc = tensile strength of composite
σp = tensile strength of polymer matrix
Φf = volume fraction of filler
a, b, c, d are constants depending on the type of filler. "a" relates to stress concentration and is based on adhesion characteristics of the filler material. "b" is normally 0.67. c and d are constants that are inversely related to particle size.

Elastic modulus
The elastic modulus (Young's modulus) of a filled polymer can be found using the equation below:

E = E0 (1 + 2.5Φ + 14.1Φ2)
where:
E0 = Modulus of unfilled resin or binder
Φ = Filler concentration

Polymers with smaller additions of filler follow this equation closely. In general addition of filler materials will increase the modulus. The additions of calcium carbonate and talc will increase the elastic modulus, while the addition of elastic filler materials can reduce the value slightly. Filler materials increase the modulus due to their rigidity or stiffness and good adhesion with the polymeric matrix.

Impact resistance (toughness) 
In general fillers will increase impact resistance. The contributing factors that improve impact resistance is particle size, particle shape and particle rigidity. Fibers improve impact resistance the most due to their large aspect ratio. Low hardness fillers will decrease impact strength. Particle size, within a specific range can increase the impact strengths based on the filler material.

Wear resistance
The wear volume (Ws) for plastic materials can be calculated:

Ws = KμPDW/(EIs)
where:

K = Proportionality constant
P = force
E = Modulus
D = Sliding distance
W = load
Is= Interlaminar shear strength

Matrix and filler both contribute to wear resistance. In general a filler is selected to decrease the friction coefficient of the material. Particle size and shape are contributing factors. Smaller particle size increase wear resistance because they cause less debris. silica, alumina, molybdenum disulfide, and graphite powder are common fillers that improve wear resistance.

Fatigue resistance
Filler can have a negative or positive effect on fatigue resistance depending on the filler type and shape. In general fillers create small discontinuities in the matrix. This can contribute to crack initiation point. If the filler is brittle fatigue resistance will be low, whereas if the filler is very ductile the composite will be fatigue resistant. Adhesion is also an important factor influencing fatigue resistance. If stress is higher than the particles adhesion a crack will form/propagate. Fiber ends are areas where cracks initiate most often due to the high stress on fiber ends with lower adhesion. Talc is a filler that can be used to increase fatigue resistance.

Thermal deformation 
Filler materials have a large influence on thermal deformation in crystalline polymers. Amorphous polymers are negligibly affected by filler material. Glass fiber additions are used the most to deflect the most heat. Carbon fibers have been shown to do better than glass in some base materials. In general fibrous materials are better at deflecting heat than particle fillers.

Creep 
Creep resistance is heavily impacted by filler materials. The equation below shows the creep strain of a filled material:

εc(t)/εm(t) = Em/Ec
where:
εc(t) = is strain of filled polymer
εm(t) = is strain of matrix or unfilled polymer
Em = is Young's Modulus of matrix
Ec =is the Young's Modulus of filled polymer

The better the filler bonds with the matrix the better creep resistance will be. Many interactions will have a positive influence. Glass beads and fibers both have been shown to improve creep resistance in some materials. Aluminum oxide also has a positive effect on creep resistance. Water absorption will decrease the creep resistance of a filled material.

Weldability of plastic fillers
Additions of filler materials can drastically effect the weldability of the plastic. This also depends on the type of welding process used. For ultrasonic welding, fillers like calcium carbonate and kaolin can increase the resin's ability to transmit ultrasonic waves. For electromagnetic welding and hot plate welding additions of talc and glass will reduce the weld strength by as much as 32%. The strength of the plastic after welding would decrease with increasing amount of fillers in the matrix compared to the bulk material. Use of abrasive fillers can have an effect on the tool used for welding. Abrasive fillers will degrade the welding tools faster, for example, the surface of the ultrasonic horn in contact with the plastic. The best way to test the weldability of a filler material is to compare weld strength to resin strength. This can be hard to do since many filler materials contain different level of additives that change the mechanical behavior.

Applications of filler in plastic industry
Filler is a widely used in the production process of plastic products. Filler is used to change the properties of the original plastic. By using plastic filler, manufacturers can save production costs as well as raw materials.

Undeniably the importance of filler masterbatch in improving the physical properties of plastics, especially minimizing cost and production efficiency. With the advantage of price and stability, plastic filler supports the production of:
Blow molding
Blown film & lamination
Extrusion (pipe, sheet)
Injection Molding
Nonwoven fabric
Raffia
Thermoforming

See also
Adulterant

References

Materials
Papermaking
Plastics additives